Fantastic Mr. Fox is an opera in three acts composed by Tobias Picker to a libretto by Donald Sturrock based on Roald Dahl's children's novel of the same name. It was premiered by Los Angeles Opera at the Dorothy Chandler Pavilion on December 9, 1998. 

In 2010, it was adapted into an abridged version with seven instrumentalists, and in 2011, a full-length version with the same reduced orchestration. In 2019, Fantastic Mr. Fox was recorded by the Boston Modern Orchestra Project and Odyssey Opera and released on Albany Records and was subsequently awarded The 2020 Grammy Award for Best Opera Recording.

Performance history
Picker's second opera (after his 1996 Emmeline) Fantastic Mr Fox was commissioned by the Roald Dahl Foundation. It received its world premiere performance by the Los Angeles Opera on December 9, 1998. 

In 2010, Stephen Barlow staged a new version of the work commissioned by Opera Holland Park especially designed to be performed promenade style in the gardens of Holland Park. This version, in an abridged form for seven instruments, starred Grant Doyle as Mr. Fox, Olivia Ray as Mrs. Fox, Laura Woods (Mezzo-Soprano) as Agnes The Digger, Jaimee Marshall as Miss Hedgehog, Henry Grant Kerswell, Peter Kent and John Lofthouse as Farmers Boggis, Bunce and Bean. 

An additional full-length orchestral version was toured by English Touring Opera in 2011. The world premiere of a full-length seven-instrument chamber version was produced September 2011 in Pittsburgh, PA and starred Daniel Teadt as Mr. Fox, Katherine Brandt as Mrs. Fox, Leah Dyer as Miss Hedgehog, Sean Donaldson, Jeffrey Gross, Sean Lenhart as Farmers Boggis, Bunce & Bean.

In 2014, the Boston Modern Orchestra Project and Odyssey Opera performed and recorded Fantastic Mr. Fox at Boston University's Jordan Hall, conducted by Gil Rose and featuring John Brancy as Mr. Fox, Krista River as Mrs. Fox, and Andrew Craig Brown, Edwin Vega, and Gabriel Preisser as Boggis, Bunce, & Bean. The recording of this performance was released in 2019 on BMOP/sound, and won the 2020 Grammy Award for Best Opera Recording.

Roles

Synopsis 
A modern fable, Fantastic Mr. Fox is a story about good vs. evil, animal vs. human, and technology. With the help of the other creatures of the forest, Mr. Fox must outwit his enemies to keep his family safe. Mr. Fox finds that he may have stolen one hen too many from the henhouse, as the meanest farmers anywhere — Boggis, Bunce, and Bean (one fat, one short, one lean) — conspire to rid their lands of the Fox family once and for all. The Foxes are able to evade capture with the help of some woodland friends, leaving the farmers laying in wait while the animals help themselves to the fruit of the farmers’ lands. Having had their revenge, the animals return for a sumptuous feast far from danger in the Foxes‘ new home, while the farmers continue to wait in the rain.

Notes and references

Sources
Battle, Laura (March 4, 2011). "Foxy business on the road". Financial Times
Rich, Alan (11 December 1998). "Fantastic Mr. Fox", Variety
Schott Music, Fantastic Mr. Fox

External links
Fantastic Mr. Fox at Tobias Picker's official website
Los Angeles Opera review of Fantastic Mr. Fox
Fantastic Mr. Fox - Full Version at Schott Music 
Fantastic Mr. Fox - Chamber Version for Seven Players at Schott Music
Fantastic Mr. Fox - Reduced Orchestration Version at Schott Music
Interview with the Telegraph

1998 operas
English-language operas
Operas by Tobias Picker
Operas
Operas based on novels
Musicals based on works by Roald Dahl